is a compilation album by Japanese novelty heavy metal band Animetal, released through Sony Records on May 21, 1998. The album compiles the A-sides of the various singles they had released from 1996 to 1998. With the exception of "Animetal" (which was previously released under Funhouse Records), all of the singles were released by Sony.

Track listing
All tracks are arranged by Animetal.

Personnel 
 - Lead vocals
 - Guitar (except where indicated)
Masaki - Bass (except where indicated)

with

 - Lead vocals (4, 6)
 - Guitar (1)
 - Bass (1)
Take-Shit - Bass (2)
 - Drum programming (1)
Katsuji - Drums (except where indicated)
 - Drums (3-4)
 - Drums (5, 7)
Shinki - Drums (9)
 - Keyboards (6)
 - Keyboards (8)

Footnotes

References

External links 

1998 compilation albums
Animetal albums
Japanese-language compilation albums
Sony Music Entertainment Japan compilation albums